Paul O'Brien (born 16 July 1968) is a New Zealand equestrian. He competed in the team eventing at the 2000 Summer Olympics. He identifies as gay.

References

External links
 

1968 births
Living people
New Zealand male equestrians
Olympic equestrians of New Zealand
Equestrians at the 2000 Summer Olympics
Sportspeople from Auckland
People from Takapuna

New Zealand LGBT sportspeople
LGBT equestrians